Elachista pallens is a moth of the family Elachistidae. It is found in Turkmenistan. Adults have been recorded from mid-April to mid-August. There are probably two generations per year.

References

pallens
Moths described in 1990
Moths of Asia